Route 20 is a  state highway in the U.S. state of Connecticut. It extends from Route 8 in rural Winchester to Interstate Route 91 in Windsor. Route 20 consists of two distinct sections: a long, winding, scenic rural road, and a section of the freeway linking I-91 to Bradley International Airport.

Route description
Route 20 begins at an intersection with Route 8 in Winchester and heads northeastward to Barkhamsted.  It then cuts across the northwest corner of Barkhamsted to Hartland. In Hartland, Route 20 continues northeastward to meet Route 181, then turns north to curve around the Barkhamsted Reservoir.  East of the reservoir, it turns southeast to meet Route 179 and continues into Granby. In Granby, Route 20 continues southeastward to meet Route 219, then turns eastward to briefly overlap Route 189 and cross US 202 and Route 10 before leaving Route 189 and continuing into East Granby.

In East Granby, Route 20 continues eastward to meet Route 187, then turns southeastward along the boundary of Bradley International Airport to meet the Bradley Airport Connector at the Windsor Locks town line. At this point, Route 20 joins the Bradley Airport Connector freeway.  It continues southeastward along the Windsor Locks-Windsor town line, intersecting with Route 75 before ending at an intersection with I-91 at the southern tip of Windsor Locks.

The portion of Route 20 within East Granby is known as the Connecticut Air National Guard Memorial Highway. The Bradley Airport Connector is also known as the 82nd Airborne Memorial Highway.

History

In 1922, the alignment of modern Route 20 was designated as two separate state highways: Highway 133 from Route 8 in Colebrook to Route 10 in Granby, and Highway 343 from Route 187 in East Granby to Route 159 in Windsor Locks. In the 1932 state highway renumbering, Route 20 was established as a single route incorporating old Highways 133 and 343, with an additional extension east of the Connecticut River along old Highway 105 (modern Route 190) to Stafford Springs (ending at what was then Route 15). Route 20 crossed the Connecticut River on Bridge Street and overlapped US 5 into Thompsonville.

The Barkhamsted Reservoir was filled in the 1940s causing Route 20 to be relocated to go around the north end of the reservoir. Route 20 was also shifted southward near Windsor Locks around the same time to make way for an air base, which is now Bradley International Airport. The relocation of Route 15 in 1948 to the new Wilbur Cross Highway (then a four lane surface road) also resulted in an eastward extension of Route 20 to end at the new highway.

The Bradley Airport Connector, an expressway connecting the airport to I-91, was constructed and opened to traffic in 1961. When the new expressway opened, Route 20 was relocated to use most of the Connector and was truncated to end at I-91. Route 140 was extended west across the Connecticut River to use the former Route 20 alignment in Windsor Locks and Route 190 was extended east to use the former alignment between Enfield and Union.

Expansion of Route 20 

Since the 1960s, it was suggested that the connector be elongated to serve other northern Connecticut towns. The highway would extend westward to U.S. Route 44 in Barkhamsted and go eastward over I-91 and along Route 190 to I-84. This proposal never went anywhere. Another similar proposal was made in 1967. This one stated that the expressway would go west into Granby center and east to I-84. This proposal also never followed through.

Major intersections

References

External links

 CT-20 Expressway
 Connecticut Route 20
 CT 20 (Greater New York Roads)

020
Transportation in Hartford County, Connecticut
Transportation in Litchfield County, Connecticut